Tsubota (written: 坪田) is a Japanese surname. Notable people with the surname include:

 (born 1956), Japanese footballer
Teruto Tsubota (1922-2013), American humanitarian and United States Marine
Yuki Tsubota , (born February 3, 1994), is a Canadian skier

Japanese-language surnames